The Long Day Closes may refer to:
"The Long Day Closes" (song), an 1868 part song by Henry Fothergill Chorley with music by Arthur Sullivan
The Long Day Closes (film), a 1992 British film directed and written by Terence Davies